4,5-Dihydroorotic acid is a derivative of orotic acid which serves as an intermediate in pyrimidine biosynthesis.

References

Pyrimidinediones
Carboxylic acids